Chang An-lo (born 13 March 1948), also known as the White Wolf, is a Taiwanese Chinese ultranationalist, organized crime figure, entrepreneur, and politician. He is supportive of Chinese unification, having founded the Chinese Unification Promotion Party.

Work with the Triad
In 1985, Chang was convicted and incarcerated in the United States for ten years for drug smuggling.

A reputed former leader of the Bamboo Union crime brotherhood, Chang fled Taiwan in 1996 after being placed on the wanted list by authorities in Taipei for involvement in organized crime, leading him to live in exile in Shenzhen, People's Republic of China. Chang is credited with giving the Bamboo Union a political mission and a touch of romantic character which has made it more appealing to gain members from rival criminal gangs.

During his time in China, the Chinese Unity Promotion Party was founded in 2004. He then started a Taiwan-based branch of the party in 2005. He returned to Taiwan in June 2013 and was arrested by Taiwanese police on arrival at Songshan Airport and released on bail. President Ma Ying-jeou received criticism for his lax treatment of Chang.

Political career
Upon his return to Taiwan, Chang opened a campaign headquarters affiliated with the "Chinese Unification Promotion Party" in downtown Tainan in order to prepare for elections in 2016.

Following a police raid of one of the party's headquarters in November 2013, police stated their concerns about the political party's links to organized crime to the press. Police alleged that the political party was being used as a front for membership in the Bamboo Union gang in New Taipei City; police also allege that illegal firearms had been trafficked and used in racketeering and turf war by the Yeh Shih branch (named after historical figure Ye Shi).

In 2013, his party claims that it has a membership of 20,000 persons, and 75 branch-offices (or headquarters).

In one notable protest in February 2019, Chang tripped and stumbled into his own prop coffin that he had brought to symbolise Taiwanese fatalities that would result from resistance to invasion from the PRC. In August 2019, Chang was arrested by Taiwanese police and prosecutors charged him and five party workers with taking illicit political donations, embezzlement, and tax evasion.

Notes

References

 

1948 births
Anti-Japanese sentiment in Taiwan
Bamboo Union
Fugitives wanted by Taiwan
Living people
Politicians of the Republic of China on Taiwan from Taipei
Republic of China politicians from Jiangsu
Taiwanese gangsters
Taiwanese people from Jiangsu
Tamkang University alumni
Triad members
Leaders of political parties in Taiwan
Taiwanese political party founders
Drug traffickers